Chlorotherion punctatus is a species of beetle in the family Cerambycidae. It was described by Monné in 1996.

References

Trachyderini
Beetles described in 1996